Gadesco-Pieve Delmona is a comune (municipality) in the Province of Cremona in the Italian region Lombardy, located about  southeast of Milan and about  northeast of Cremona.

Gadesco-Pieve Delmona borders the following municipalities: Cremona, Grontardo, Malagnino, Persico Dosimo, Vescovato.

References

Cities and towns in Lombardy